Rama Kishore Singh is an Indian politician and is a former member of the Indian Parliament from Vaishali, Bihar. He won the 2014 Indian general election as a Lok Jan Shakti Party candidate. He defeated vice-president of RJD Raghuvansh Prasad Singh by around 1 lakh votes. He enjoys considerable support from the Rajput caste and is one of the biggest leaders of the community.

Life
Rama Kishore Singh belongs to a Rajput community and is married to Bina Singh, with whom they have four children. One of their sons, Rajiv Singh, died in a road accident in Uttar Pradesh. Singh was previously a member of the Lok Janshakti Party. In 2020 Tejashwi Yadav tried to include him into Rashtriya Janata Dal to attract Rajput voters, but the induction was put off due to interference by Lalu Prasad Yadav. Singh later managed to get on the ticket from Rashtriya Janata Dal for his wife Bina Singh, who contested in Bihar Assembly polls 2020 from Mahnar constituency.

Criminal cases
Rama Singh has been accused of a number of crimes, including murder and kidnapping. He has been a member of Bihar Legislative Assembly several times from the Mahnar constituency, which falls under Hajipur Lok Sabha constituency. The Hajipur Lok Sabha constituency is a stronghold of Lok Janshakti Party and Ram Vilas Paswan has represented it several times. Singh was not given a chance to be on the ticket by LJP from Vaishali Lok Sabha constituency in 2019, although he defeated Raghuvansh Prasad Singh in an election for the same seat in 2014.

Chandrama Singh murder case (2004)
In August 2004, Chandrama Singh, a candidate for local government elections in Desri, was shot and killed. Rama Singh and others were prime suspects. The court acquitted him as he was in incarcerated in Hajipur for three months leading up to the murder.

Jaychand kidnapping case, 2001
Rama Singh was also involved in Jaychand Vaidya kidnapping case of Bhilai. Singh however claimed himself to be innocent.

Jamshedpur triple murder case
Singh was also accused of a triple murder that took place in Jamshedpur. He was the prime accused and was imprisoned during the inquiry period, however he remained hospitalized during that time.

Singh was one of the prime targets of the Nitish Kumar government as a part of its pledge against crime. He along with other criminals such as Surajbhan Singh, Anant Kumar Singh, Mohammad Shahabuddin, Ritlal Yadav and others were booked and tried under the special court established by the government.

See also
Pradeep Mahto

References

India MPs 2014–2019
Lok Sabha members from Bihar
Lok Janshakti Party politicians
People from Vaishali district
1964 births
Living people
Babasaheb Bhimrao Ambedkar Bihar University alumni